Lyria pauljohnsoni is a species of sea snail, a marine gastropod mollusk in the family Volutidae, the volutes.

Description
The length of the shell attains 35-45 mm.

Distribution
This marine species occurs off Madagascar.

References

 Poppe G.T. & Terryn Y. 2002. Description of a new volute (Gastropoda : Volutidae) from southern Madagascar. Novapex 3(1): 51–53 (look up in IMIS).
 Bouchet, P.; Fontaine, B. (2009). List of new marine species described between 2002-2006. Census of Marine Life.

External links

Volutidae
Gastropods described in 2002